High elf may refer to:

 Calaquendi, an elvish race from J. R. R. Tolkien's The Lord of the Rings
High Elves, a race in the Warhammer Fantasy setting, and the Eldar of Warhammer 40,000
 Quel'Dorei, descendants of the Night Elves in the Warcraft universe who later mostly became Blood Elves
Altmer, a race of elves in the Elder Scrolls universe
 In Dungeons and Dragons, High Elves is one of the terms for:
 Grey Elves
 Moon Elves
 Gold Elves
 Sun Elves

See also 

Dark elf (disambiguation)
Elves in fiction